Henry Cadogan (1642 – 13 January 1713/14) of Liscartan, County Meath was an Irish barrister.

Early life
Cadogan was the son of Maj. William Cadogan and Elizabeth Roberts. His father was born at Dunster, Somerset to an old Pembrokeshire family. He served with Oliver Cromwell in Ireland, and was rewarded for his services with the estate of Liscarton, where Henry grew up. Henry also acquired lands in County Limerick.

His paternal grandfather was Henry Cadogan of Llanbetter, a grandson of Thomas Cadogan, of Dunster, who claimed descent from the ancient princes of Wales (called Cadwgan ap Elystan Glodrydd "The Renowned", Prince of Fferreg, of Dol-y-Gaer, Breconshire).

Career
Educated at Trinity College, Dublin, he was a barrister and also High Sheriff of Meath in 1700. Unlike his eldest son William, he did not play a leading part in public life.

Personal life
On about 31 July 1671, he married Bridget Waller, the second daughter of the regicide Sir Hardress Waller and Elizabeth Dowdall, by whom he had five children:

 William Cadogan, 1st Earl Cadogan (1672–1726), who married Dutch heiress Margaretta Munter in 1704.
 Ambrose Cadogan (d. 1693), who died unmarried.
 Charles Cadogan, 2nd Baron Cadogan (1685–1776), who married Elizabeth Sloane, a daughter of the Irish-born physician and landowner Sir Hans Sloane.
 Frances Cadogan, who died aged 9.
 Penelope Cadogan (d. 1746), who married Sir Thomas Prendergast, 1st Baronet.

Cadogan on 13 January 1714/15 at Dublin.

Descendants
Through his eldest son William, he had two granddaughters: Lady Sarah Cadogan (b. 1705), who married Charles Lennox, 2nd Duke of Richmond; and Margaret Cadogan (b. 1707), who married the Hon. Charles John Bentinck (fourth son of William Bentinck, 1st Earl of Portland).

References
Notes

Sources

1642 births
1714 deaths
H
High Sheriffs of Meath